John Lawrence Island is an island of the Andaman Islands and belongs to the South Andaman administrative district, part of the Indian union territory of Andaman and Nicobar Islands.

Etymology
The island is named after Sir John Lawrence who served as Viceroy of India from 1864 to 1869.

Geography
The island belongs to the Ritchie's Archipelago and is located between Peel Island and Henry Lawrence Island, named for Sir John Lawrence's brother.
John Lawrence Island is long in shape. It is surrounded by beaches on three sides. Since the island is quite long in shape, the beach stretches to a long distance.

Administration
Politically, John Lawrence Island is part of Port Blair Taluk.

Demographics 
The island is uninhabited.

Transportation
The only way to reach John Lawrence Island is by local boat services. There is boat service from Port Blair and Havelock Island through which you can reach this island. However, boat rides are subject to weather and condition of the sea.
There is a small channel between John Lawrence Island and Henry Lawrence Island that is lined with thick mangrove forests. Terrestrial moist forests and mangroves form the main vegetation of John Lawrence Island.

Shipwrecks
On 12 November 1844, a cyclone deposited two British vessels, sailing separately, about a quarter of a mile apart on the shore of the island. The survivors were all rescued by 5 January 1845.

References 

Ritchie's Archipelago
Uninhabited islands of India
Islands of South Andaman district
Islands of the Andaman Sea
Islands of India
Islands of the Bay of Bengal